Louis Goss (born May 22, 1987) is an American professional stock car racing driver. He currently competes part-time in the ARCA Midwest Tour, driving the No. 36 Chevrolet.

Racing career

As a local short track driver, Goss raced a number of classes at local tracks in Wisconsin, including super stocks and super late models. He also competed in the Mid-American Stock Car Series, which his father had also raced in. In 2018, Goss' brother talked to a crewman from B. J. McLeod Motorsports, and the two eventually served on pit crews later that year. Also in 2018, Goss was approved by NASCAR to run Truck Series races at tracks one mile in length and under.

During the 2020 season, Goss ran part-time in the ARCA Midwest Tour.

NASCAR

Goss created his own NASCAR Gander Outdoors Truck Series team after buying old trucks from Mike Harmon over the 2018–2019 offseason, and bought his own trucks because of the large expense of renting other teams' trucks. Goss was scheduled to make his series debut at Iowa Speedway in June 2019, but he withdrew from the event after arriving at the track without a fuel cell and some engine parts. He made his series debut in the 2019 CarShield 200 at World Wide Technology Raceway the next week. He also rented owner points to Darwin Peters Jr. at Eldora in 2019.

Personal life
Before quitting his job for his race team in 2019, Goss was a mechanical engineer working in Sturgeon Bay, Wisconsin. He graduated from Green Bay Southwest High School, and attended University of Wisconsin-Green Bay.

Motorsports career results

NASCAR

Gander Outdoors Truck Series

References

External links

 

1987 births
Living people
ARCA Midwest Tour drivers
NASCAR drivers
Racing drivers from Wisconsin
Sportspeople from Green Bay, Wisconsin